Kalinin Square is a square in Zayeltsovsky District of Novosibirsk, Russia. It is located at the intersection of Krasny Avenue and Dusi Kovalchuk Street. Perevozchikov Street is also adjacent to the square.

Architecture
The architectural appearance of the square was formed in the 1960s. It is surrounded by three identical 7-storey residential buildings, 8-storey residential building, the building of the Novosibirsk Instrument-Building Plant and the Building of Design Organizations.

Transport
Kalinin Square is one of the largest transport hubs on the right bank of Novosibirsk. There are stops for buses, trolleybuses, marshrutkas and trams, as well as 4 entrances to the Zayeltsovskaya Metro Station.

References

Squares in Novosibirsk
Zayeltsovsky City District, Novosibirsk